Charbak was Young Pioneer camp (Russian: Пионерский лагерь) in the Soviet Union in the town of Aravan.

There were 8 buildings, including theater, two swimming pools, one stadium and playgrounds for other activities.

These days the camp is idle. Due to the lack of financial support, the camp is standing empty for years.

Osh Region
Charbak